June Ritchie (born 31 May 1941) is a British actress.

Biography

Ritchie trained at RADA, where she graduated in 1961, having won the Emile Littler Award for Most Promising Actress and the Ronson Award for the outstanding female student.

She came to prominence after starring in the role of Ingrid Rothwell opposite Alan Bates in the 1962 film adaptation of A Kind of Loving.

In 1963, she starred with Margaret Rutherford in the comedy The Mouse on the Moon and appeared as a 'dance hostess' with Sylvia Syms in The World Ten Times Over. She also made two movies with Ian Hendry at around the same time, Live Now, Pay Later and This is My Street.

After marrying and starting a family, she cut back on her acting roles, but later made a successful comeback on stage (most memorably in a high-profile musical adaptation of Gone with the Wind in London), and appeared in many British television dramas including The Mallens, The Saint, The Baron, Minder, Tales of the Unexpected, and Père Goriot.

In 1975, Ritchie joined Ray Davies and the Kinks on their album, Soap Opera, having played the same role in the 1974 single drama, Starmaker, on which the album was based.  She sang the role of "Andrea" ("Norman"'s wife).

Filmography

Film

Television

References

External links
 June Ritchie at the Internet Movie Database.
 June Ritchie Website

English film actresses
1941 births
Living people
People from Blackpool
Alumni of RADA
English stage actresses
English television actresses